Chip In is a 2020 South Korean television series starring Oh Na-ra and Kim Hye-jun. It aired on MBC from July 22 to August 13, 2020 at 21:30 (KST) time slot for 8 episodes.

Synopsis
A famous painter, Yoo In-ho (Nam Moon-chul) gets diagnosed as terminally ill. On his 58th birthday, he plans to share his last will and testimony. His legacy and immense wealth slowly draw out his family's greed, causing a fierce mental battle amongst them. There are too many people around him who are only after his legacy and wealth, including his ex-wife Ji Sul-young (Kim Jung-young), who has to take care of him, Kim Ji-hye (Oh Na-ra), a former mistress and mother of his only child and daughter, Bit-na (Kim Hye-jun), and his half-brother Dok Ko-chul (Han Soo-Hyun).

Cast

Main
 Oh Na-ra as Kim Ji-hye, the mistress of Yoo In-ho.
 Kim Hye-jun as Yoo Bit-na, a nurse student and the only daughter of painter Yoo In-ho who is not interested in his wealth and legacy.
 Song Ji-woo as young Bit-na

Supporting

Yoo family
 Nam Moon-chul as Yoo In-ho, Bit-na's father who is a famous painter that was diagnosed as terminally ill.
 Kim Jung-young as Ji Sul-young, In-ho's ex-wife who came back to nurse him after it was discovered he was terminally ill.
 Choi Kyu-jin as Yoo Hae-joon, In-ho's nephew from his deceased brother Yoo In-gook who is a law student and whom he adopted as his son.
 Ok Chan-yu as young Hae-joon
 Han Soo-hyun as Dok Go-chul, In-ho's half-brother who is a conman with four convictions of fraud.
 Kim Si-eun as Dok Go-sun, Dok Go-chul's daughter and In-ho's niece who lives in his house.

Yoo family employees
 Lee Yoon-hee as Moon Jung-wook, In-ho's friend from college and also his manager who lives in the same house.
 Nam Mi-jung as Mrs. Park, the family maid who has been working for 20 years.
 Kim Myung-sun as Jin Yeon-hee, a lawyer and the executor of Yoo In-ho's last will and testimony.

Others
 Lee Seung-hyeong as a doctor
 Jung Chul-soon as Detective Kang
 Park Jung-eon as a reporter
 Kwon Dong-ho as Detective Hong Jae-gyu
 Jang Jae-kwon as an interviewer
 Wie Shin-ae as a pharmacist

Ratings
In this table,  represent the lowest ratings and  represent the highest ratings.

Awards and nominations

References

External links
  
 
 

MBC TV television dramas
Korean-language television shows
2020 South Korean television series debuts
2020 South Korean television series endings
South Korean mystery television series
South Korean comedy television series
South Korean thriller television series